Bokprogrammet ("The Book Programme") is a Norwegian TV series on literature, which was shown on NRK1 from 2006 to 2014. The programme looked at writing with a famous author, or at a theme or genre. The programme was presented by Hans Olav Brenner for the first few years, and by Siss Vik from 2010 onwards.

References

External links
 The programme at NRK Nett-TV

NRK original programming
2000s Norwegian television series
2010s Norwegian television series